Parapolystichum microsorum, synonym (in part) Lastreopsis microsora, known as the creeping shield fern is a common small plant found in eastern Australia and New Zealand. The habitat is rainforest or moist sheltered eucalyptus forests. It may form large colonies. The specific epithet microsora translates to "small sori".

Subspecies
Two subspecies are recognized:
Parapolystichum microsorum subsp. microsorum – Australia (eastern Queensland, eastern New South Wales and eastern Victoria), Norfolk Island
Parapolystichum microsorum subsp. pentagulare (Colenso) Labiak, Sundue & R. C. Moran – New Zealand and Chatham Island

References

Dryopteridaceae
Flora of New South Wales
Flora of Victoria (Australia)
Flora of Queensland